Harold Lyons may refer to:

Harold Lyons, member of Project Space Track
Harold Lyons, candidate for Manchester Council election, 2002
Harold Lyons, see Timeline of time measurement technology

See also
Harry Lyons (disambiguation)